{{Infobox animanga/Print
| type            = manga
| author          = Shingo
| publisher       = Shogakukan
| publisher_en    =
| demographic     = Children
| imprint         = 
| magazine        = CoroCoro Comic
| magazine_en     = Co-Co! (Hong Kong)
| first           = August 15, 2010
| last            = January 15, 2014
| volumes         = 10
| volume_list     = 
}}

 is a manga series written and illustrated by Shingo. In Japan, the comics have been published in Shogakukan's Monthly CoroCoro comics since September 2010. The manga follows the adventures of Harubaru Hinode and his childhood friend and rival, Raichi Kuronashi, as they battle with their BakuTech, which are superior to normal Bakugan due to special metal parts.

BackgroundBaku Tech! Bakugans was serialized in the Monthly CoroCoro comics, where the chapters do not have names, but rather chapter numbers instead. The chapter names only appear in the shinsōban manga volumes.

The individual chapters are collected by Shogakukan in a series of shinsōban volumes. The first volume was released on December 24, 2010. The last volume was released on February 28, 2014.

Characters
Hinode Harubaru (日ノ出 春晴(ひので はるばる)): A Pyrus brawler. Voiced by Marie Mizuno. 
Kuronashi Raichi (黒無 来智(くろなし ライチ)): Harubaru's friendly rival, and a Darkus brawler. Voiced by Miku Watanabe. 
Master Shimo (マスター・シモ): The Mentor of Team Dragaon from the Bakugan Dojo. Voiced by Masanori Machida.
Tatsuma (タツマ): A rookie described as a prodigy. The third protagonist of the anime series. An Aquos Brawler. Voiced by Yuri Yamaoka.
Koh Grif (グリフ・コウ): One of the heirs of the Grif Plutocracy. Haos Brawler. Voiced by Kozo Dozaka.
Sho Grif (グリフ・ショウ): Koh's older brother and a Ventus brawler. Voiced by Ryo Agawa.
Quilt (キルト): Master Shimo's teacher. Aquos Brawler. Voiced by Kazuyoshi Shiibashi.
Karashina (カラシナ): Leader of the Shadow Sanjuushi who specializes in "ninja techniques," and brawls with Darkus Bakugan. Voiced by Hiro Nakajima.
Tohga (トーガ): Imposing member of Shadow Sanjuushi and a Subterra brawler. Voiced by Mitsuaki Kanuka.
Jinza (ジンザ): Member of the Shadow Sanjushi. A boy of few words and a Haos brawler. Voiced by Yumi Uchiyama..
Master Jyou (マスター・ジョウ): Principal of Bakugan Juku, and Master Shimo's rival. Voiced by Soichiro Abe.
Zakuro (ザクロ): Primary antagonist in the manga. Leader of the Bakuthieves. A Darkus brawler. Voiced by Hidenori Takahashi.
Harou Kido (木戸破凰(きどはろう)): Also known as King Harou and Harou Dodgy. He is the two-time (manga) or three-time (anime) champion of the BakuTech Colosseum. Voiced by Masaaki Kouda.
Master Grizz (マスター・グリズ): An imposing Subterra brawler dressed in bear suit. Voiced by Hiroaki Tajiri.
Master Odore (マスター・オドレ): A lanky Ventus brawler that practices Capoeira. Voiced by Shizuma Hodoshima. 
Honoo Moetaro (炎もえたろー): A Bakugan master explaining the trials to Harubaru. Does not appear in the anime but appears in Live Action in Bakugan tournaments across Japan. 
Siam (シャム): A rare Bakugan hunter and Haos brawler. Does not appear in the anime. 
Atla (アトラ): Harubaru's opponent in round 1 of Baku TECH tournament. Does not appear in the anime.
Orochi (オロチ): Raichi's opponent in round 1 of Baku TECH tournament. Does not appear in the anime. 
Shagi (シャギ): Raichi's opponent in round 2 of Baku TECH tournament. Does not appear in the anime. 
Hyoga (ヒョーガ): Raichi's opponent in round 2 of Baku TECH tournament. Does not appear in the anime.
Catol (キャトル): Grif brothers' opponent in Baku TECH tournament. Does not appear in the anime.
Mister Up (ミスター・アップ): Younger version of Master Jyou.
Mister Down (ミスター・ダウン): Younger version of Master Shimo, and Mister Up's companion.

Volume list

Adaptations
An anime adaptation had been green-lit. The series premiered in TV Tokyo, TV Osaka, TV Aichi, TV Hokkaido, TV Setouchi, TVQ Kyushu Broadcasting on April 7, 2012 as part of the Oha Coro POP programme.Baku Tech! Bakugan Gachi'' television series premiered in TV Tokyo from April 6, 2013 to December 28, 2013 as part of the Oha Coro POP programme, followed by TV Setouchi and TVQ Kyushu Broadcasting on 2013-04-13.

References

External links
ShoPro TV website: BakuTECH! Bakugan, BakuTECH! Bakugan Gachi
TV Tokyo site: BakuTECH! Bakugan

Bakugan
2012 anime television series debuts
2013 anime television series debuts
Japanese children's animated action television series
Japanese children's animated adventure television series
Japanese children's animated science fantasy television series
Manga series
Manga based on video games
Shogakukan manga
TV Tokyo original programming
Comics based on toys
Television shows based on toys